Indonesia competed at the 1984 Summer Paralympics in Stoke Mandeville, Great Britain and New York City, United States. Indonesia won 2 medals, 1 silver and 1 bronze and finished joint 41st in the medal table with The Bahamas.

Medalists

See also
 1984 Paralympic Games
 1984 Olympic Games
 Indonesia at the Paralympics
 Indonesia at the Olympics
 Indonesia at the 1984 Summer Olympics

References 

1984
1984 in Indonesian sport
Nations at the 1984 Summer Paralympics